2012 Regional League Division 2 Central & Eastern Region is the 4th season of the League competition since its establishment in 2009. It is in the third tier of the Thai football league system.

Changes from Last Season

Team Changes

Promoted Clubs

Ratchaburi were promoted to the 2012 Thai Division 1 League after winning the 2011 Regional League Division 2 championship pool.

Relocated Clubs
Maptaphut Rayong, Royal Thai Fleet, Thanyaburi RA United  re-located to the Regional League Central-East Division  from the  Regional League Bangkok Area Region 2011.

Samut Sakhon have all been moved into the Regional League Bangkok Area Region 2012.

Expansion Clubs

Trat joined the newly expanded league setup.

Renamed Clubs
 Sa Kaeo City renamed Sa Kaeo.

Renamed Clubs

 Thanyaburi RA United renamed Looktabfah F.C.

Stadium and locations

League table

References

External links
 Football Association of Thailand

Regional League Central-East Division seasons
Cen